The Class 648 is a two car, diesel multiple unit operated by the Deutsche Bahn for stopping regional rail services on unelectrified lines.

General Information

The class are also known as Alstom Coradia LINT 41, which is used by many railway operators across Europe.

Liveries

All units are in the standard Verkehrsrot Red livery, however some carry brands for the areas they operate in such as HarzWeserBahn.

Services
DB Class 648 are used on the following services in the different regions (2011):

Bayern
 Nürnberg - Neuhaus
 Nürnberg - Simmelsdorf-Hüttenbach
 Fürth - Cadolzburg
 Fürth - Markt Erlbach
 Neustadt Aisch - Steinach - Rothenburg

Niedersachsen
 Bad Harzburg - Goslar - Seesen - Kreiensen - [Northeim - Göttingen] / [Holzminden]
 Braunschweig - Salzgitter - Seesen - Herzberg
 Nordhausen - Herzberg - Northeim - [Göttingen]/[Bodenfelde]
 RB85 - Göttingen - Bodenfelde - Ottbergen
 RB86 - Northeim - Bodenfelde - [Ottbergen]
 RB37 - Uelzen - Soltau - Bremen Hbf

Northrhein-Westfalen
 RB52 - Dortmund - Herdecke - Hagen - Brügge - Lüdenscheid
 RB53 - Dortmund - Schwerte - Iserlohn
 RB54 - Unna - Fröndenberg - Menden - Neuenrade
 RE57 - Dortmund - Hörde - Fröndenberg - Arnsberg - Meschede - Bestwig - Winterberg
 RB92 - Finnentrop - Attendorn - Sondern - Olpe
 RB93 - Siegen - Kreuztal - Hilchenbach - Vormwald - Erndtebrück - Birkelbach - Bad Berleburg
 RB95 - Dillenburg - Haiger - Siegen - Betzdorf - Wissen - Au

Schleswig-Holstein
 Büchen - Aumühle
 Flensburg - Kiel
 Lübeck - Travemünde
 Lübeck - Puttgarden
 Lübeck - Kiel
 Lübeck - Lüneburg
 Kiel - Neumunster

References

Citations
 
 

Train-related introductions in 2000
Diesel multiple units of Germany
Passenger rail transport in Germany